John Michael Spaun Jr. (born August 21, 1990), better known as "J.J.", is an American professional golfer.

Early life

Spaun was born in Los Angeles, California. He graduated from San Dimas High School in 2008. He played collegiately for San Diego State University, where he was a two-time All-Mountain West Conference selection in 2010, 2011 and Conference Player of the Year in 2012. He was named a Third-team All-American in 2011 and Second-team All-American in 2012 highlighted by three-straight individual wins his senior year. Spaun majored in social science while at San Diego State, and turned professional in 2012.

Professional career
Spaun played his first three professional seasons on PGA Tour Canada, finishing 35th in 2013. After missing six of seven cuts in 2014, he went to PGA Tour Canada Q School, where he finished T8. Spaun had his first professional win at the 2015 Staal Foundation Open. The win moved Spaun inside the top three on the PGA Tour Canada (renamed Mackenzie Tour in 2015) Order of Merit, earning entry into the 2015 RBC Canadian Open. The Canadian Open was Spaun's PGA Tour debut, where he finished T41. 

With two events remaining in the 2015 season, Spaun broke the record in PGA Tour Canada single-season earnings. He made the cut in the eleven events he played, which included a tour-record four consecutive top-five finishes and six consecutive top-10s. Spaun finished as the PGA Tour Canada Order of Merit winner, which made him fully exempt on the Web.com Tour for 2016. Spaun also played in the 2016 Northern Trust Open through a sponsor exemption reserved for minority athletes. He is of Filipino descent from his mother's side. Spaun can also claim Mexican ancestry.

Spaun locked up his PGA Tour privileges for 2017 after winning the News Sentinel Open. He earned his first PGA Tour win at the 2022 Valero Texas Open after 147 PGA Tour starts.

Professional wins (3)

PGA Tour wins (1)

Web.com Tour wins (1)

Web.com Tour playoff record (0–1)

PGA Tour Canada wins (1)

Results in major championships
Results not in chronological order before 2019 and in 2020.

CUT = missed the halfway cut
"T" indicates a tie for a place
NT = No tournament due to COVID-19 pandemic

Results in The Players Championship

CUT = missed the halfway cut

See also
2016 Web.com Tour Finals graduates
2021 Korn Ferry Tour Finals graduates

References

External links

SDSU profile of Spaun

American male golfers
San Diego State Aztecs men's golfers
PGA Tour golfers
Korn Ferry Tour graduates
Golfers from Los Angeles
Golfers from Scottsdale, Arizona
American sportspeople of Filipino descent
American sportspeople of Mexican descent
Sportspeople from Newport Beach, California
1990 births
Living people